1977 was the second season of the Saudi Premier League of football.

The league was expanded to have ten teams, again playing on a home and away basis. Al-Ahli won the championship and took the title to Jeddah for the first time.

Ohod and Al-Shabab were relegated.

Stadia and locations

League table

Promoted:Al Tai, Al Riyadh.
Full records are not known at this time

External links 
 RSSSF Stats
 Saudi Arabia Football Federation
 Saudi League Statistics
 Article writer for Saleh Al-Hoireny - Al-Jazirah newspaper 13-08-2010

Saudi Premier League seasons
Saudi
1977–78 in Saudi Arabian football